Chris Jennings may refer to:

 Chris Jennings (gridiron football) (born 1983), gridiron football running back
 Chris Jennings (musician) (born 1978), Canadian jazz double bassist, composer, arranger and educator